Sateen is a fabric made using a satin weave structure, but made with spun yarns instead of filament.

The sheen and softer feel of sateen is produced through the satin weave structure. Warp yarns are floated over weft yarns, for example four over and one under (for a five-harness satin weave). In a weft-faced satin or sateen, the weft yarns are floated over the warp yarns. Standard plain weaves use a one-over, one-under structure.

In modern times cheaper rayon is often substituted for cotton. Better qualities are mercerized to give a higher sheen.

See also
 Percale – A plain weave
 Satinet – Another satin-like weave
 Twill – A different weave

References 

Woven fabrics